KRI Nagapasa (403) is a submarine of the Indonesian Navy. She is the lead ship of the s of the Indonesian Navy that are an upgraded variant of Korea's . The vessel was built by the South Korean Daewoo Shipbuilding & Marine Engineering (DMSE) and was commissioned in August 2017. She is one of three submarines purchased for a total of $1.1 billion ($350m per submarine) from Korea.

Specifications

Equipment
For navigation, the vessel uses the Sagem Sigma 40 XP inertial navigation system and the ECPINS-W Integrating Navigation and Tactical Systems from OSI Maritime Systems.

Nagapasas periscope is a combination of the Hensoldt Sero 400 and OMS 100. Submarines of the class also possess ZOKA acoustic torpedo countermeasures manufactured by Turkish company ASELSAN.

Service history
The submarine was ordered on 21 December 2011 as part of a US$1.07 billion contract between Indonesia and South Korea to provide three submarines, with Daewoo Shipbuilding & Marine Engineering being awarded the contract. A keel laying ceremony was held on 9 April 2015 and the vessel was launched on 24 March 2016, followed by a year-long crew training and sea trials.

The vessel was commissioned by Indonesian Minister of Defense Ryamizard Ryacudu in South Korea on 2 August 2017. Afterwards, the submarine sailed to Surabaya, where she was received by Chief of Staff of the Navy Ade Supandi on 28 August 2017. Her name is based on the Nagapasha, a mythical weapon in the Ramayana. Nagapasa was then assigned to the Indonesian Navy Eastern Fleet Command (Koarmatim).

Shortly after Nagapasas commissioning, she experienced power shortages and required a battery replacement.

See also
 List of active Indonesian Navy ships

References

Attack submarines
Submarines of Indonesia
Jang Bogo-class submarines
Nagapasa